Firuz Kandeh-ye Sofla (also Romanized as Fīrūz Kandeh-ye Soflá; also known as Fīrūz Kandeh-ye Pā’īn and Pā’īn Maḩalleh-ye Fīrūz Kandeh) is a village in Rudpey-ye Jonubi Rural District, in the Central District of Sari County, Mazandaran Province, Iran. At the 2006 census, its population was 1,150, in 297 families.

References 

Populated places in Sari County